Peronella is a fairy tale or fable that is considered a traditional English tale. Peronella is a pretty country lass who exchanges places with an old wizened queen, and receives the homage due to royalty, but gladly takes back her rags and beauty.

References

English fairy tales
Female characters in fairy tales